A financial calculator or business calculator is an electronic calculator that performs financial functions commonly needed in business and commerce communities (simple interest, compound interest, cash flow, amortization, conversion, cost/sell/margin, etc.). It has standalone keys for many financial calculations and functions, making such calculations more direct than on standard calculators. It may be user programmable, allowing the user to add functions that the manufacturer has not provided by default.

Examples of financial calculators are the HP 12C, HP-10B and the TI BA II.

A wide number of graphing calculators, like the Casio FX-9860GII, the Texas Instruments TI-89 Titanium, and the Hewlett Packard HP 48gII include complex financial calculations.

References

Calculators